The free fatty acid receptor is a G-protein coupled receptor which binds free fatty acids.  There are four variants of the receptor, each encoded by a separate gene (FFAR1, FFAR2, FFAR3, FFAR4). Preliminary findings suggest that FFAR2 and FFAR3 may interact to form a FFAR2-FFAR3 receptor heteromer.

References

External links

 
 
 

G protein-coupled receptors